Saulius Ritter (born 23 August 1988) is a Lithuanian rower, best known for winning a silver medal at the 2016 Summer Olympics and a gold medal at the 2011 European Rowing Championships.

He competed at the 2012 Summer Olympics in the men's double sculls with Rolandas Maščinskas.

Ritter and Maščinskas won gold at the 2011 and 2014 European Championships, silver at the 2013 and 2015 World Championships and the 2013 European Championships and bronze medal at the 2016 European Championships.

At the 2016 Summer Olympics, he won the silver medal in the same event with Mindaugas Griskonis.

In 2021 Ritter announced about retirement from professional sport.

Biography
Currently living in Trakai.  Studying in Mykolas Romeris University.

Personal life 
Ritter is engaged to another Lithuanian rower Milda Valčiukaitė.

References

External links
 

Lithuanian male rowers
1988 births
Living people
Sportspeople from Vilnius
People from Trakai
Rowers at the 2012 Summer Olympics
Rowers at the 2016 Summer Olympics
Rowers at the 2020 Summer Olympics
Olympic rowers of Lithuania
Lithuanian Sportsperson of the Year winners
World Rowing Championships medalists for Lithuania
Olympic silver medalists for Lithuania
Olympic medalists in rowing
Medalists at the 2016 Summer Olympics
Universiade gold medalists for Lithuania
Universiade medalists in rowing
European Rowing Championships medalists
Medalists at the 2015 Summer Universiade
Medalists at the 2013 Summer Universiade
Mykolas Romeris University alumni